Jahan Teri Yeh Nazar Hai is a 1981 Bollywood action film song by Kishore Kumar in the film Kaalia, written and directed by Tinnu Anand, the film was produced by Iqbal Singh. The film stars Amitabh Bachchan (in the title role), Parveen Babi, Asha Parekh, Kader Khan, Pran, Amjad Khan, K.N. Singh and Jagdeep. The music is by R.D. Burman. It was written by Majrooh Sultanpuri. The film was  hit.

Music video
In the film the Amitabh Bachhan character sings the song in a nightclub while pinching an expensive diamond necklace off the neck of the beautiful posh girl he is dancing with, all the while thwarting the designs of the girl's original dance partner who had set out to do the same thing himself. The song is a series of boasts about his own prowess at sleight of hand and taunts directed at the rival thief.

Notes
 The song, Jahan Teri Yeh Nazar Hai influenced the song, Palat - Tera Hero Idhar Hai featured on the 2014 film, Main Tera Hero. This song was inspired by Zia Atabay - Hele Mali Iranian Singer which was released 1977.

References

Hindi songs
Hindi film songs
Kishore Kumar songs
Songs with music by R. D. Burman